Crackle of Death is a 1974 film, the fourth produced in the Night Stalker film series.

It combined the Kolchak: The Night Stalker episodes "Firefall" and "The Energy Eater" with additional narration by Darren McGavin as Kolchak. It also contains new dialogue by McGavin, Oakland and Grinnage, as well as new "scenes", such as a newspaper on a desk and the image of the Doppelganger being inserted into old footage (for example, when Kolchak looks at the sky, he sees the Doppelganger's giant face). The new material was put together in late March 1976.

Before Crackle of Death was  a third movie entitled The Demon and the Mummy that combined two more episodes in a similar manner; namely, "Demon In Lace" and "Legacy of Terror".

All four episodes comprising these films were subsequently withdrawn from the original television syndication package. They were not made available in their entirety again until a Columbia House VHS video release in the 1990s. The TV-edited films have never been released on home video.

See also
List of Kolchak: The Night Stalker episodes
The Night Stalker (1st movie): The original vampire story.
The Night Strangler (2nd movie): A mad scientist achieves immortality through murderous means.
The Night Killers (3rd unproduced movie): Aliens replace prominent citizens with androids in Hawaii.

References

External links

1976 television films
1970s English-language films
Films directed by Alex Grasshoff
American horror television films
1976 horror films
1970s fantasy films
1976 films
The Night Stalker (franchise)
1974 films
1970s American films